Aloysius Joseph Grygo (August 14, 1918 – September 27, 1971) was an American football running back and quarterback in the National Football League. He played for the Chicago Bears. He played college football for the South Carolina Gamecocks.

References

1918 births
1971 deaths
American football running backs
American football quarterbacks
Chicago Bears players
South Carolina Gamecocks football players